The 2011 Copa del Sol took place in Elche and La Manga, Spain between January 27 and February 7, 2011. The competition was played at La Manga Stadium and Estadio Martínez Valero along with various smaller training pitches for "loser games". Unlike the first edition of the tournament the format of the competition was played as a knockout tournament. The winner of the tournament was awarded €40,000 FC Karpaty Lviv won the tournament after beating FC Shakhtar Donetsk with 1–0 in the final.

Bracket
Note:  Copenhagen withdrew themselves from the tournament after the Quarter-finals.  Aalesund were drawn as Lucky Losers and went on into the Semi-Finals.

Round of 16

Quarter-finals

Placement matches

Round of 16 Losers

Losers

Winners

Quarter-finals losers

Semi-finals
Note:  Copenhagen withdrew themselves from the tournament after the Quarter-finals.  Aalesund were drawn as Lucky Losers and went on into the Semi-Finals.

Final

Winner

Goalscorers
3 goals

  César Santin (Copenhagen)
  Douglas Costa (Shakhtar Donetsk)
  Costin Curelea (Sportul Studenţesc)

2 goals

  Pablo Herrera Barrantes (Aalesund)
  Henrikh Mkhitaryan (Shakhtar Donetsk)
  Alex (Spartak Moscow)
  Tommy Knarvik (Tromsø)
  Morten Berre (Vålerenga)
  Harmeet Singh (Vålerenga)

1 goal

  Daniel Arnefjord (Aalesund)
  Kjell Rune Sellin (Aalesund)
  Jesper Grønkjær (Copenhagen)
  Dame N'Doye (Copenhagen)
  Zdeněk Pospěch (Copenhagen)
  Kenneth Zohore (Copenhagen)
  Andreas Drugge (IFK Göteborg)
  Tobias Hysén (IFK Göteborg)
  Oleh Holodyuk (Karpaty Lviv)
  Ihor Khudobyak (Karpaty Lviv)
  Denys Kozhanov (Karpaty Lviv)
  Serhiy Kuznetsov (Karpaty Lviv)
  Guillermo Molins (Malmö FF)
  Davy Claude Angan (Molde)
  Pape Paté Diouf (Molde)
  Magne Hoseth (Molde)
  Magnus Wolff Eikrem (Molde)
  Christian Gytkjær (Nordsjælland)
  Matti Lund Nielsen (Nordsjælland)
  Ovidiu Herea (Rapid Bucharest)
  Gjermund Åsen (Rosenborg)
  Michael Jamtfall (Rosenborg)
  Morten Moldskred (Rosenborg)
  Trond Olsen (Rosenborg)
  Rade Prica (Rosenborg)
  Luiz Adriano (Shakhtar Donetsk)
  Dmytro Chyhrynskyi (Shakhtar Donetsk)
  Alex Teixeira (Shakhtar Donetsk)
  Willian (Shakhtar Donetsk)
  Jano Ananidze (Spartak Moscow)
  Artyom Dzyuba (Spartak Moscow)
  Aiden McGeady (Spartak Moscow)
  Viorel Ferfelea (Sportul Studenţesc)
  Florin Maxim (Sportul Studenţesc)
  Magnus Andersen (Tromsø)
  Fredrik Björck (Tromsø)
  Remi Johansen (Tromsø)
  Simen Møller (Tromsø)
  Sigurd Rushfeldt (Tromsø)
  Håvard Nielsen (Vålerenga)
  Daniel Kolář (Viktoria Plzeň)
  Jan Rezek (Viktoria Plzeň)

Own goals
  Oscar Wendt (Copenhagen, playing against IFK Göteborg)
  Markus Halsti (Malmö FF, playing against Spartak Moscow)

Broadcasting rights
: TV 2
: Canal 9
: Orange Sport
: Dolce Sport
: NTV+
: TV4 Sport
: TK Football
 Africa: Setanta Sports

See also
2010 Copa del Sol

Footnotes

External links
https://web.archive.org/web/20110628002506/http://www.copadelsol.org/

2011
2011 in association football